Curtis Dickman is an American Neurosurgeon at Barrow Neurological Institute, and is recognized internationally for his pioneering work in the field of Thoracoscopic Neurosurgery. He serves as Director of the Spine Research Laboratory and Associate Chief of the Spine Section at Barrow Neurological Institute.

Career 

After graduating from Medical school at the University of Arizona, Dickman began his neurosurgical training at Barrow Neurological Institute, and was one of the first group of residents to train under Drs. Robert Spetzler and Volker Sonntag. He completed a fellowship in spine at the University of Florida, and soon thereafter was added to the faculty of the Department of Neurosurgery at Barrow Neurological Institute.

Thoracoscopic Sspine surgery 

In the early 1990s, Dickman became heavily involved in both the development and popularization of endoscopic assisted spine procedures within neurosurgery. He pioneered the field of thoracoscopic neurosurgery, becoming one of the first neurosurgeons to use endoscopes to treat diseases of the thoracic spine via a minimally invasive method. He translated a relatively new technology utilized in the cardiothoracic surgical sub-specialty for neurosurgical purposes, and developed some of the basic instruments commonly used today by neurosurgeons and orthopedic surgeons alike for minimally invasive thoracic spinal procedures. Thoracoscopic spine surgery has since become a common treatment modality for a multitude of neurosurgical pathologies, including Herniated Thoracic Discs and Hyperhidrosis. Dickman currently remains one of the most prolific thoracoscopic spine surgeons in the world, and has written the only textbook on the subject.

In addition to his work on Thoracoscopic procedures, Dickman has published numerous textbooks and papers on the craniocervical junction. He is well known for the "Sonntag-Dickman Fusion," a special method of fusing the upper cervical spine.

Recent Publications

References

External links
The Barrow Neurological Institute
Biography of Dr. Dickman
Papers by Dr. Dickman
Bio of Dickman

American neurosurgeons
Living people
Year of birth missing (living people)
University of Arizona alumni